USS Lexington (CV/CVA/CVS/CVT/AVT-16), nicknamed "The Blue Ghost", is an  built during World War II for the United States Navy. Originally intended to be named Cabot, the new aircraft carrier was renamed while under construction to commemorate the recently-lost , becoming the sixth U.S. Navy ship to bear the name in honor of the Battle of Lexington.

Since 1992, the ship has been docked in Corpus Christi, Texas, where she operates as a museum.

Construction and commissioning
The ship was laid down as Cabot on 15 July 1941 by Fore River Shipyard in Quincy, Massachusetts. In May 1942, which had been built in the same shipyard two decades earlier, was sunk at the Battle of the Coral Sea. In June, workers at the shipyard submitted a request to Navy Secretary Frank Knox to change the name of a carrier currently under construction there to Lexington. Knox agreed to the proposal and Cabot was renamed Lexington on 16 June 1942, the fifth U.S. Navy ship to bear the name of the Revolutionary War Battle of Lexington. She was launched on 23 September 1942, sponsored by Mrs. Theodore Douglas Robinson. Lexington was commissioned on 17 February 1943, with Captain Felix Stump in command.

Service history

Lexington was commissioned in February 1943 and saw extensive service through the Pacific War. For much of her service, she acted as the flagship for Admiral Marc Mitscher, and led the Fast Carrier Task Force through their battles across the Pacific. She was the recipient of 11 battle stars and the Presidential Unit Citation. Following the war, Lexington was decommissioned, but was modernized and reactivated in the early 1950s, being reclassified as an attack carrier (CVA). Later, she was reclassified as an antisubmarine carrier (CVS). In her second career, she operated both in the Atlantic/Mediterranean and the Pacific, but spent most of her time, nearly 30 years, in Pensacola, Florida, as a training carrier (CVT).

Lexington was decommissioned in 1991, with an active service life longer than any other  ship. Following her decommissioning, she was donated for use as a museum ship in Corpus Christi, Texas. In 2003, Lexington was designated a National Historic Landmark.

World War II
After a shakedown cruise in the Caribbean, Lexington sailed via the Panama Canal to join the Pacific fleet.

One of the carrier's first casualties was 1939 Heisman Trophy winner Nile Kinnick. During the ship's initial voyage (to the Caribbean) in 1943, Kinnick and other naval fliers were conducting training flights off her deck. The Grumman F4F Wildcat flown by Kinnick developed a serious oil leak while airborne and was unable to return to the Lexington, crashing into the sea four miles from the ship. Neither Kinnick nor his plane were ever recovered.

Lexington arrived at Pearl Harbor on 9 August 1943, and participated in a raid on Tarawa air bases in late September, followed by a raid against Wake Island in October, before returning to Pearl Harbor to prepare for the Gilbert Islands operation. From 19 to 24 November, she made searches and flew sorties in the Marshalls, covering the landings in the Gilberts. Her aviators downed 29 enemy aircraft on 23 and 24 November.

Kwajalein raid

Lexington sailed to raid Kwajalein on 4 December. Her gunners splashed two of the enemy torpedo planes that attacked at midday, but were ordered not to open fire at night as Admiral Charles Pownall then in command believed it would give their position away (he was later replaced).

At 19:20 that night, a major air attack began while the task force was under way off Kwajalein. At 23:22, parachute flares from Japanese planes silhouetted the carrier, and 10 minutes later, she was hit by a torpedo on the starboard side, knocking out her steering gear. Nine people were killed, two on the fantail and seven in the chief petty officers' mess room, which was a repair party station during general quarters. Four members of the affected repair party survived because they were sitting on a couch that apparently absorbed the shock of the explosion. Settling  by the stern, the carrier began circling to port amidst dense clouds of smoke pouring from ruptured tanks aft. To maintain water-tight integrity, damage control crews were ordered to seal the damaged compartments and welded them shut, applying heavy steel plates where needed. An emergency hand-operated steering unit was quickly devised, and Lexington made Pearl Harbor for emergency repairs, arriving on 9 December. She reached Bremerton, Washington, on 22 December for full repairs, completed on 20 February 1944. The error in judgment concerning opening fire at night was never repeated, as thereafter gun crews were ordered to open fire anytime the ship came under attack. Following this attack, the ship was reported as sunk by Japan's Tokyo Rose, the first of several such assertions.

Battle of the Philippine Sea

Lexington returned to Majuro in time to be present when Rear Admiral Marc Mitscher took command of the newly formed Task Force 58 (TF 58) on 8 March. Mitscher took Lexington as his flagship, and after a warm-up strike against Mille, the Fast Carrier Task Force began a series of operations against the Japanese positions in the central Pacific.  She supported Army landings at Hollandia (currently known as Jayapura) on 13 April, and then raided the strongpoint of Truk on 28 April. Heavy counterattacks left Lexington untouched, her planes splashing 17 enemy fighters, but for the second time, Japanese propaganda announced her sunk.

A surprise fighter strike on Saipan on 11 June nearly eliminated all air opposition over the island, then battered it from the air for the next five days. On 16 June, Lexington fought off a fierce attack by Japanese torpedo bombers based on Guam, once again emerging unhurt, but 'sunk' a third time by propaganda pronouncements. As Japanese opposition to the Marianas operation provoked the Battle of the Philippine Sea on 19–20 June, Lexington played a major role in TF 58's great victory in what was later called the "Great Marianas Turkey Shoot". With over 300 enemy aircraft destroyed the first day, and a carrier, a tanker, and a destroyer sunk the second day, American aviators nearly knocked Japanese naval aviation out of the war; with the planes went the trained and experienced pilots without whom Japan could not continue air warfare at sea.

Using Eniwetok as her base, Lexington sent aircraft on sorties over Guam and against the Palaus and Bonins into August. She arrived in the Carolinas on 7 September for three days of strikes against Yap and Ulithi, then began attacks on Mindanao, the Visayas, the Manila area, and shipping along the west coast of Luzon, preparing for the coming assault on Leyte. Her task force then blasted Okinawa on 10 October and Formosa two days later to destroy bases from which opposition to the Philippines campaign might be launched. She was again unscathed through the air battle fought after the Formosa assault.

Battle of Leyte Gulf

Now covering the Leyte landings, Lexingtons aircraft scored importantly in the Battle of Leyte Gulf, the climactic American naval victory over Japan. While the carrier came under constant enemy attack in the engagement, her aircraft assisted in sinking  and scored hits on three cruisers on 24 October. The next day, with  aircraft, they sank , and alone sank . Later in the day, they aided in sinking . As the retiring Japanese were pursued, her aircraft then sank  with four torpedo hits on 5 November off Luzon.

Later that day, Lexington was introduced to the kamikaze as a flaming Japanese aircraft crashed near her island, destroying most of the island structure and spraying fire in all directions. On 9 November, Lexington arrived in Ulithi to repair battle damage while hearing that Tokyo once again claimed her sunk. Casualties were considered light despite the island structure's destruction.

Chosen as the flagship for Task Group 58.2 (TG 58.2) on 11 December, she struck at the airfields of Luzon and Formosa during the first nine days of January 1945, encountering little enemy opposition. The task force then entered the South China Sea to strike enemy shipping and air installations. Strikes were flown against Saipan, Camranh Bay in then Indochina, Hong Kong, the Pescadores, and Formosa. Task force planes sank four merchant ships and four escorts in one convoy and destroyed at least 12 in another, at Camranh Bay on 12 January. Leaving the China Sea on 20 January, Lexington sailed north to strike Formosa again on 21 January and Okinawa again on 22 January.

After replenishing at Ulithi, TG 58.2 sailed on 10 February to hit airfields near Tokyo on 16 February 1945, and on 17 February to minimize opposition to the Iwo Jima landings on 19 February. Lexington flew close support for the assaulting troops from 19 to 22 February, then sailed for further strikes against the Japanese home islands and the Nansei Shoto before heading for overhaul at Puget Sound.

Rear Admiral Sprague's task force
Lexington was combat-bound again on 22 May, sailing via Alameda and Pearl Harbor for San Pedro Bay, Leyte, where she joined Rear Admiral Thomas L. Sprague's task force for the final round of air strikes which battered the Japanese home islands from July-15 August, when the last strike was ordered to jettison its bombs and return to Lexington on receiving word of the Japanese surrender. During this period, she had launched attacks on Honshū and Hokkaidō airfields, and Yokosuka and Kure naval bases to destroy the remnants of the Japanese fleet. In the actions at Kure, F4U-1D Corsairs of VBF94 flying off the Lexington, sank the hybrid battleship/aircraft carrier Ise. Flying against heavy enemy fire, squadron commander Lester Wall Jr. dropped a 1000lb bomb down her stack, exploding her boilers and breaking her keel in a conflagration matching that of the destruction of the Arizona at Pearl Harbor four years earlier. The Lt. Cmdr. and several men in his squadron were awarded the Navy Cross for this action.  She had also flown bombing attacks on industrial targets in the Tokyo area.

After hostilities ended, her aircraft continued to fly air patrols over Japan. The previously mentioned Lt.Cmdr. Wall first located and then led in supply drops to prisoner-of-war camps on Honshū that had been abandoned by the Japanese. He was subsequently awarded the Distinguished Flying Cross for this mission. In December, she was used to ferry home servicemen in what was known as Operation Magic Carpet, arriving in San Francisco on 16 December.

After the war

Lexington was decommissioned at Bremerton, Washington, on 23 April 1947, and entered the National Defense Reserve Fleet. While in reserve, she was designated attack carrier CVA-16 on 1 October 1952. In September 1953, Lexington entered the Puget Sound Naval Shipyard. She received the Essex-class SCB-27C and SCB-125 conversions in one refit, being then able to operate the most modern jet aircraft. The most visible distinguishing features were an angled flight deck, steam catapults, a new island, and the hurricane bow.
 
Lexington was recommissioned on 15 August 1955, Captain A. S. Heyward Jr. in command. Assigned to San Diego as her home port, she operated off California until May 1956, sailing then for a six-month deployment with the 7th Fleet. She based on Yokosuka for exercises, maneuvers, and search and rescue missions off the coast of China, and called at major Far Eastern ports until returning San Diego on 20 December. She next trained Air Group 12, which deployed with her on the next 7th Fleet deployment. Arriving Yokosuka on 1 June 1957, Lexington embarked Rear Admiral H. D. Riley, Commander Carrier Division 1, and sailed as his flagship until returning San Diego on 17 October.

1958 Taiwan Strait crisis

Following overhaul at Bremerton, her refresher training was interrupted by the Second Taiwan Strait Crisis; on 14 July 1958, she was ordered to embark Air Group 21 at San Francisco and sail to reinforce the 7th Fleet off Taiwan, arriving on station on 7 August and returning San Diego on 19 December. Now the first carrier whose planes were armed with AGM-12 Bullpup guided missiles, Lexington left San Francisco on 26 April 1959 for another tour of duty with the 7th Fleet. She was on standby alert during the Laotian crisis of late August and September. Following this, she exercised with British naval forces before returning to San Diego, arriving on 2 December. In early 1960, she underwent an overhaul at the Puget Sound Naval Shipyard.

Far East
Lexingtons next Far Eastern tour began late in 1960, and was extended well into 1961 by renewed tension in Laos. Returning to west coast operations, she was ordered in January 1962 to prepare to relieve  as aviation training carrier in the Gulf of Mexico, and she was redesignated CVS-16 on 1 October 1962. However, during the Cuban Missile Crisis, she resumed duty as an attack carrier, and she did not relieve Antietam until 29 December 1962 at Pensacola, Florida.

Training carrier
Into 1969, Lexington operated out of her home port, Pensacola, as well as Corpus Christi qualifying student aviators and maintaining the high state of training of both active-duty and reserve naval aviators. Her work became of increasing significance as she prepared the men vital to the Navy and Marine Corps operations over Vietnam, where naval aviation played a major role. Lexington marked her 200,000th arrested landing on 17 October 1967, was redesignated CVT-16 on 1 January 1969 and was redesignated again as AVT-16 on 1 July 1978. She continued as a training carrier for the next 22 years until she was relieved by Forrestal, and Lexington was decommissioned and struck on 8 November 1991.

On 18 August 1980, Lexington became the first aircraft carrier in United States naval history to have women stationed aboard as crew members.

On 29 October 1989, a student naval aviator lost control of his T-2 training aircraft after an aborted attempt to land on Lexingtons flight deck. The aircraft inverted and hit the island with its left wing, killing four crew members (including the pilot of the plane who had begun an ejection sequence) and one civilian maintenance worker and injuring seventeen. The island suffered no major damage, and fires from the burning fuel were extinguished within 15 minutes.

Lexington was the final Essex-class carrier in commission, after  had been decommissioned in 1976.

USS Lexington Museum

On 26 November 1991, the US Navy turned the Lexington over to the City of Corpus Christi. On 15 June 1992, the ship was donated as a museum and now operates as the "USS Lexington Museum on the Bay" at 2914 North Shoreline Boulevard, Corpus Christi, Texas. A MEGAtheater (similar to IMAX) was added in the forward aircraft elevator space. Lexington was designated a National Historic Landmark in 2003. The ship is carefully maintained, and areas of the ship previously off-limits are becoming open to the public every few years. One of the most recent examples of this is the catapult room.

The ship's World War II-era gun battery is also being partially restored using guns salvaged from scrapped ships. Most notable among these are 5"/38 DP gun turrets saved from the scrapping of the heavy cruiser . They have been mounted in the approximate locations where similar mounts once existed as part of the ship's original World War II-era fit. After the coast guard cutter Dauntless' overhaul, her 3"/50cal gun was put on display onboard the Lexington.

On 5 February 2010, the USS Lexington hosted its 17th annual "Stagedoor Canteen".

The National Naval Aviation Museum, at Naval Air Station Pensacola, has a small carrier deck mock-up, whose flight deck is constructed from deck boards salvaged from Lexington.

Popular culture
In 1975 Lexington served as a filming location at sea the feature movie Midway and again in 1987 for the TV miniseries War and Remembrance.

In July 2007, the popular TV show Ghost Hunters filmed aboard the USS Lexington, looking for evidence of ghosts, and in December 2009, she was the subject of an episode of Ghost Lab, on the Discovery Channel.

In 2014, Pepsi used the ship to film a commercial in preparation for the 2015 Super Bowl. The commercial, titled "Operation Halftime," featured country-music singer Blake Shelton performing for veterans and their families.

Awards
The crew of Lexington received the Presidential Unit Citation for heroism in action against enemy Japanese forces, 11 battle stars for major engagements during World War II service, and other awards.

See also

U.S. Navy museums (and other aircraft-carrier museums)
CAPT Eugene McDaniel, former POW, Navy Cross recipient and commanding officer of Lexington from 25 May 1977 to 30 November 1978
List of National Historic Landmarks in Texas
National Register of Historic Places listings in Nueces County, Texas

References

Further reading

External links

USS Lexington Museum On the Bay official website
WWII Archives U.S.S. Lexington (CV-16) original Ship Action Reports Scanned in from the National Archives
National Historic Landmark Program: Lexington, USS (Aircraft Carrier)

USS Lexington pictures from the U.S. Naval History Center

Essex-class aircraft carriers
Ships built in Quincy, Massachusetts
1942 ships
World War II aircraft carriers of the United States
Cold War aircraft carriers of the United States
Tourist attractions in Corpus Christi, Texas
Museums in Nueces County, Texas
Museum ships in Texas
National Historic Landmarks in Texas
Military and war museums in the United States
Military and war museums in Texas
Naval museums in the United States
Ships on the National Register of Historic Places in Texas
National Register of Historic Places in Nueces County, Texas